Anastasios "Tasos" Venetis  (born 24 March 1980) is a Greek former professional footballer who played as a defender.

Club career
Born in Larissa, Venetis began his career with Apollon Larissa, and transferred to Iraklis at 16. The next season moved to AEL after failing to make an appearance. After two years, he moved to Scotland and spent three-and-a-half years with Scottish Premier League side Dundee United, with a further six months at Ross County. At Ross County he scored once against Inverness Caledonian Thistle. Venetis moved back to his homeland Greece in 2003, where he would play for Akratitos, Kallithea, AEL and OFI in the Superleague.

Venetis played for the Greece national under-21 football team, making his debut in 2000.

References

External links
 
 http://www.apollonlarissasfc.gr/index.php/omada/istoria

1980 births
Living people
Footballers from Larissa
Greek footballers
Greece under-21 international footballers
Association football midfielders
Iraklis Thessaloniki F.C. players
Athlitiki Enosi Larissa F.C. players
A.P.O. Akratitos Ano Liosia players
Kallithea F.C. players
OFI Crete F.C. players
A.O. Kerkyra players
PAE Kerkyra players
Dundee United F.C. players
Ross County F.C. players
Scottish Premier League players
Scottish Football League players
Super League Greece players
Greek expatriate footballers
Expatriate footballers in Scotland
Greek expatriate sportspeople in Scotland
Football League (Greece) players